Filipeni is a commune in Bacău County, Western Moldavia, Romania. It is composed of eight villages: Bălaia, Brad, Filipeni, Fruntești, Mărăști, Pădureni, Slobozia, and Valea Boțului.

References

Communes in Bacău County
Localities in Western Moldavia